Ingrid Law (born May 1, 1970) is a New York Times bestselling author. In 2009, her children's fantasy novel Savvy was awarded a Newbery Honor medal. When Law was six her family moved to Colorado and lives in the Pacific Northwest.

Bibliography
Savvy (2008)
Scumble (2010)
Switch (2015)
Guys Read: Heroes and Villains (2017)

References

21st-century American novelists
American women novelists
American young adult novelists
1970 births
Living people
21st-century American women writers
Newbery Honor winners
Women writers of young adult literature